Sainz de Baranda is a station on Line 6 and Line 9 of the Madrid Metro, located at the intersection of Doctor Esquerdo and Alcalde Sainz de Baranda streets in the Retiro district in Madrid, Spain. It is located in fare Zone A. The station is named after the street, which in turn is named after the first mayor of Madrid, .

The station opened on 10 October 1979 when the first section of Line 6 was inaugurated. On 31 January 1980, the first section of Line 9 was opened from Pavones to Sainz de Baranda, where it connected to the rest of the Madrid Metro network. It ceased to be a terminus station when Line 9 was extended to Avenida de América on 24 February 1986.

References 

Line 6 (Madrid Metro) stations
Line 9 (Madrid Metro) stations
Railway stations in Spain opened in 1979
Buildings and structures in Retiro District, Madrid